This article refers to sports broadcasting contracts in Italy. For a list of broadcasting rights in other countries, see Sports television broadcast contracts.

In Italy, due to an anti-siphoning law known as 8/99, the following sport events must be broadcast for free, even partially, delayed or highlighted:
The Winter and Summer Olympics
Every game played by the Italy national football team
FIFA World Cup final (live compulsory)
UEFA European Championship final (live compulsory)
Semi-finals and final of UEFA Champions League, UEFA Europa League and UEFA Europa Conference League, if at least an Italian team is involved.
All Six Nations matches involving Italy
Semi-finals and finals of the FIBA World Championship, Waterpolo World Championship, Volleyball World Championship and Rugby World Cup if Italy is involved
F1 Italian Grand Prix and MotoGP Italian motorcycle Grand Prix
The Giro d'Italia
The final and semi-finals of the Davis Cup and Fed Cup if Italy are involved
World Cycling Championship

Due to their length, Olympics and Giro may be broadcast partially for free.

Football

National teams 
Italy national football team: RAI (all men's U21, men's U19, men's U17, women's and futsal teams matches live until 31/12/2022)
Japan national football team: Mediaset (all men's U21, men's U20 and women's teams matches, live)

FIFA 
2026 FIFA World Cup: RAI
2023 FIFA U-20 World Cup: RAI
2023 FIFA U-17 World Cup: Mediaset
2023 FIFA Women's World Cup: RAI
2022 FIFA U-20 Women's World Cup: Sky Sport (all matches live)
2022 FIFA U-17 Women's World Cup: Sky Sport (all matches live)
2023 FIFA Beach Soccer World Cup: TBA

UEFA 
UEFA Euro 2024: TBA
European Qualifiers 2023-24:
RAI (all Italy matches live)
Mediaset (one match per matchday, excluded Italy matches, live)
Sky Sport (delayed Italy matches, remaining matches live)
European World Cup qualifiers 2025–26: RAI (all Italy matches live)
UEFA Nations League :
RAI (all Italy matches, semi-final #1 and final #1 live until 2027)
Mediaset (one match per matchday, excluded Italy matches, semi-final #2 and final #2 live) (2022/23)
Sky Sport (delayed Italy group stage matches, remaining group stage matches, semi-finals and finals live) (2022/23)
UEFA Women's Euro 2025: -
2023 UEFA European Under-21 Championship: -
2023 UEFA European Under-19 Championship: -
2023 UEFA European Under-17 Championship: -
2023 UEFA Women's Under-19 Championship: -
2023 UEFA Women's Under-17 Championship: -

CONMEBOL 
2024 Copa América: Sky Sport

CAF 
2023 Africa Cup of Nations: Sky Sport

Clubs

World 
2023 FIFA Club World Cup: TBA

Italy 
Serie A (2022/23 and 2023/24)
DAZN (266 matches live, 114 matches live only OTT)
Sky Sport (114 matches live)
RAI and Mediaset (highlights)
Coppa Italia Frecciarossa (2022/23 and 2023/24): Mediaset (all matches live from first round onwards)
Supercoppa Italiana (2022 and 2023): Mediaset
Serie BKT (2022/23 and 2023/24):
Sky Sport (all Regular Season, Play-Off and/or Play-Out matches live)
DAZN and Helbiz Media (all Regular Season, Play-Off and/or Play-Out matches live only OTT)
Serie C:
ELEVEN (all Regular Season, Play-Off and Play-Out matches live only OTT in a pay-per-view basis) (2022/23)
RAI (one match per Regular Season matchday and one match per Play-Off round live FTA until 2025)
Coppa Italia Serie C (2022/23):
ELEVEN (all matches live only OTT) (2022/23)
RAI (one match per round live FTA until 2025)
Supercoppa di Serie C (2023):
ELEVEN ((all matches live only OTT) (2023)
RAI (one match live FTA until 2025)
Campionato Primavera 1 TIMvision Trofeo Giacinto Facchetti (2022/23 and 2023/24): Sportitalia (all Regular Season, Final Six and Play-Out matches live)
Primavera TIMvision Cup (2022/23 and 2023/24): Sportitalia (all matches live)
Supercoppa Primavera TIMvision (2022/23 and 2023/24): Sportitalia (all matches live)
Serie A TimVision (2022/23)
TIMVISION (all matches live only OTT)
Cairo Communication (one match per matchweek live FTA)
Coppa Italia Socios.com (2022/23)
TIMVISION (all matches live only OTT)
Cairo Communication (semi-finals and finals FTA live)
Supercoppa Italiana femminile (2022): TIMVISION and Cairo Communication
Serie B Femminile (2022/23): ELEVEN (all matches live only OTT)

Europe 
UEFA Champions League (2022/23 and 2023/24):
Sky Sport (121 matches live from play-off round onwards)
Mediaset (one game per matchday on Tuesday from play-off round to semi-finals and final live FTA, 104 matches live from play-off until quarter-finals live only OTT on a pay-per-view basis)
Amazon Prime Video (one game per matchday on Wednesday live from play-off round to semi-finals) (until 2026-27)
UEFA Europa League (2022/23 and 2023/24):
Sky Sport (all matches live from group stage onwards)
DAZN (all matches live from group stage onwards only OTT)
TV8 (one game per matchday live, possibility of broadcasting all semi-finals due to law 8/99 if at least an Italian team is involved)
UEFA Europa Conference League (2022/23 and 2023/24):
Sky Sport (all matches live from group stage onwards)
DAZN (all matches live from group stage onwards only OTT)
TV8 (one game per matchday live, possibility of broadcasting all semi-finals due to law 8/99 if at least an Italian team is involved)
UEFA Super Cup (2023): Amazon Prime Video
UEFA Youth League (2022/23 and 2023/24): Sky Sport
UEFA Women's Champions League (until 2025):
DAZN (all matches from group stage onwards live)
YouTube (all matches from group stage onwards live until 2023, 19 matches from group stage onwards live from 2023 to 2025)
Premier League (until 2025): Sky Sport (7 matches per matchday live)
FA (2022/23 and 2023/24): DAZN
Cup
Community Shield
EFL: (2022/23 and 2023/24): DAZN
Cup
Championship
One
Two
LFP (Spain) (2022/23 and 2023/24)
La Liga: DAZN
Segunda División:
DAZN (play-offs matches only, live)
Copa del Rey (until 2024-25): Telelombardia
DFL (until 2025): Sky Sport
Bundesliga
DFL-Supercup
DFB-Pokal: YouTube
LFP (France) (2022/23 e 2023/24): Sky Sport
Ligue 1
Ligue 2
Trophée des Champions
Coupe de France 2022/23: TBA
Eredivisie 2022/23: Mola
Scottish Professional Football League: TBA
Primeira Liga: TBA
Greek Superleague 2022/23: Mola
Greek Cup: Mola
Russian Premier League: Youtube (subscription required for live coverage) (until 2022)
Russian Super Cup (from 2022): TBA
3. Liga: YouTube (two matches per matchday live)
Regionalliga: OneFootball
Barça TV: Sportitalia
City TV: Sportitalia

Americas 
CONMEBOL (until 2026): Mola
Copa Libertadores
Copa Sudamericana
Recopa Sudamericana
CONCACAF Champions League: OneFootball
Colombian Primera A: Fanatiz
Liga MX: OneFootball
Peruvian Primera División: Fanatiz
Primera Division Argentina (until 2027): Sportitalia (4 matches per matchday live), Mola 
Liga Primera de Nicaragua: Fanatiz
Copa de la Liga Profesional (until 2027): Sportitalia (4 matches per matchday live)
Copa Argentina: Fanatiz
Campeonato Brasileiro Série A: Sportitalia, OneFootball (2023)
Campeonato Brasileiro Série B: Fanatiz
Major League Soccer: Apple TV+: all matches live (from 2023 to 2032)
USL Championship: OneFootball

Africa 
CAF: DAZN
CAF Champions League
CAF Confederation Cup
CAF Super Cup

Asia 
AFC Champions League: OneFootball
J-League: Sky Sport
Chinese Super League: OneFootball
A-League: DAZN (two matches per matchday live)
Qatar Stars League: Sky Sport
Saudi Professional League: Sportitalia

American football
NFL:
DAZN (at least four matches per week, NFL RedZone, NFL Network, all Play-Offs matches, Pro Bowl and Super Bowl live, Thanksgiving match and SB must be also broadcast on a free operator) (2023/24)
NCAA:
ESPN Player (all Regular Season, Bowl Games and College Football Playoff matches live)
Helbiz Live (2023/2024)

Baseball
MLB:
ESPN Player (all Regular Season matches, All-Star Game, Postseason and World Series matches live)
Sky Sport (until 2026) (7 Regular Season matches per week live, All-Star Game, selected Postseason games and all World Series games live)
KBO League (until 2024): ESPN Player

Basketball
2023 FIBA Basketball World Cup: ELEVEN (all matches live)
2023 FIBA Basketball World Cup Qualifiers: ELEVEN (all matches live)
2022 FIBA Women's Basketball World Cup: ELEVEN (all matches live)
EuroBasket 2022: Sky Sport and ELEVEN (all matches live)
EuroBasket Women (2023 and 2025): ELEVEN (all matches live)
2022 FIBA AmeriCup: ELEVEN (all matches live)
FIBA Women's AmeriCup (2023 and 2025): ELEVEN (all matches live)
FIBA Asia Cup: (2022 and 2025): ELEVEN (all matches live)
FIBA Women's Asia Cup (2023 and 2025): ELEVEN (all matches live)
AfroBasket (2023 and 2025): ELEVEN (all matches live)
AfroBasket Women (2023 and 2025): ELEVEN (all matches live)
FIBA Under-19 Basketball World Cup (2023 and 2025): ELEVEN (all matches live)
FIBA Under-19 Women's Basketball World Cup (2023 and 2025): ELEVEN (all matches live)
FIBA Under-17 Basketball World Cup (2023 and 2025): ELEVEN (all matches live)
FIBA Under-17 Women's Basketball World Cup (2023 and 2025): ELEVEN (all matches live)
FIBA Intercontinental Cup: DAZN
NBA (2022/23): Sky Sport (12 Regular Season games per week, all NBA All-Star Weekend events, selected Playoffs games and all NBA Finals games live)
Turkish Airlines EuroLeague (2022/23 and 2023/24): Sky Sport and ELEVEN
7DAYS EuroCup: (2022/23 and 2023/24): Sky Sport and ELEVEN
Basketball Champions League (from 2022/23): ELEVEN (all matches live)
Serie A UnipolSai (until 2025):
ELEVEN (all Regular Season and Play-Offs matches live)
Eurosport (3 Regular Season matches per matchday, select Quarter-Final matches and all Semi-Finals and Finals matches live)
PosteMobile Final Eight Coppa Italia (2024 and 2025): ELEVEN and Eurosport (all matches live)
LBA Supercoppa (2023 and 2024): ELEVEN and Eurosport (all matches live)
Lega Basket Femminile:
LBF TV (all matches live on a pay-per-view basis)
MsSport (one game per week live)

Combat sports

Boxing 
Matchroom Boxing (until 2026): DAZN
Golden Boy Promotions: DAZN
Premier Boxing Champions: FITE TV and DAZN
Top Rank: FITE TV and Eurosport
Frank Warren Boxing: Mola
Boxxer: Mola
Dream Boxing (until October 2025): DAZN (all fights live)

Kickboxing 
King of Kings (until October 2025): DAZN (all fights live)

MMA 
Bellator MMA (until 31 December 2024): MOLA TV
Bushido MMA (until October 2025): DAZN (all fights live)
UFC: DAZN
ONE Championship: ELEVEN

Wrestling 
WWE  (until 30 June 2023):
Discovery+ (all WWE Raw and WWE SmackDown episodes live, all WWE NXT, WWE Afterburn and WWE Bottom Line episodes)
WWE Network: (all WWE Pay-per-view events live)
AEW:
Sky Sport (all AEW Dynamite and AEW Rampage episodes, all AEW Pay-per-view events live) (until 31 December 2023)

Cycling
Tour de France (until 2025): RAI, Eurosport
Giro d'Italia: (until 2025): RAI, Eurosport 
Vuelta a España: Eurosport (until 2023)
UCI Road World Championships: RAI (until 2024)
UCI World Tour:
Eurosport and GCN+ (all races live)
RAI

Fencing
World Fencing Championships: RAI

Field hockey 
Hockey Series: RAI (finals tournaments only)

Futsal

World
2024 FIFA Futsal World Cup: TBA

Europe
UEFA Men's Futsal Euro: TBA (2022)
UEFA Under-19 Futsal Championship: RAI
UEFA Women's Futsal Euro: UEFA.tv
UEFA Futsal Champions League: UEFA.tv

Golf
2023 Ryder Cup: Sky Sport
The Masters: Sky Sport
U.S. Open: Sky Sport
The Open Championship: Sky Sport
PGA Championship: Sky Sport
PGA Tour (until 2033): Eurosport (all tournaments live)
DP World Tour (until 2025): Sky Sport (all tournaments live)
World Golf Championship: Sky Sport (all tournaments live)

Horse racing
Prix d'Amerique: RAI

Multi-discipline events
Olympic Games:
Eurosport (until 2032) (all events live)
RAI: (360 hours of Paris 2024 events, 250 hours of Milano-Cortina 2026 events, at leat 200 hours of LA 2028 events, at least 100 hours of 2030 Winter Olympics events and at least 200 hours of Brisbane 2032 events live FTA)
Paris 2024 Paralympic Games: RAI (all events live)
European Games (2023): TBA
World University Games: Eurosport
European Championships: RAI

Motor Racing
Formula 1 (until 2027): 
Sky Sport (Free Practices, Qualifying and all Races live)
TV8 (5 races live FTA / other races delayed FTA)
FIA Formula 2 Championship (until 2027): Sky Sport (Free Practices, Qualifying and all Races live)
FIA Formula 3 Championship (until 2027): Sky Sport (Free Practices, Qualifying and all Races live)
Porsche Mobil 1 Super Cup (until 2027): Sky Sport (Free Practices, Qualifying and all Races live)
MotoGP-Moto2-Moto3-MotoE (until 2025):
Sky Sport (Free Practices, Qualifying, Warm-up and all Races live)
TV8 (6 races live FTA / other races delayed FTA)
Superbike World Championship (until 2025):
Sky Sport (free practices, qualifying and all races live)
TV8 (all races live)
Supersport World Championship (until 2025):
Sky Sport (free practices, qualifying and all races live)
Supersport 300 World Championship (until 2025)
Sky Sport (free practices, qualifying and all races live)
British Superbike Championship (until 2027): Eurosport (all races live)
FIM Motocross World Championship (2022): Eurosport, RAI (only Italian races live)
FIM Speedway World Championship (until 2031): Eurosport (all races live)
FIA World Endurance Championship (until 2025): Eurosport (Qualifying and all races live)
FIA World Touring Car Cup (until 2030): Eurosport (Qualifying and all races live)
FIA World Rally Championship:
Sky Sport
WRC+ (all stages of all Rallies live on a pay-per-view basis)
Indycar Series: Sky Sport (until 2024)
NASCAR (2023): MOLA TV
Cup Series
Xfinity Series
Camping World Truck Series
Formula E (2022/23):
Sky Sport (Qualifying and all races live)
Mediaset (Free Practices, Qualifying and all races live FTA)
DTM: TBA
Super GT: Nismo TV (YouTube)

Rugby Union
Rugby World Cup 2023: RAI and Sky Sport
Guinness Six Nations (until 2025): Sky Sport (all matches live)
The Rugby Championship: Sky Sport (all matches live)
Autumn Nations Series: Sky Sport (all test matches live)
European Rugby Champions Cup (from 2022/23): Sky Sport
European Rugby Challenge Cup (from 2022/23): Sky Sport, Eleven Sports
United Rugby Championship 2022/23: Eurosport (all matches live)
Mitre 10 Cup: Sky Sport
Super Rugby Aotearoa: Sky Sport
Super Rugby AU: Sky Sport
Premiership Rugby: MOLA TV

Sailing
America's Cup: -
Volvo Ocean Race: -
Louis Vuitton Pacific Series: -
Clipper Round the World Yacht Race: -
Barcolana regatta: -
SailGP: ELEVEN (all events live)

Winter Sports

Alpine Skiing
FIS Alpine Ski World Cup:
Eurosport (until 2026)
RAI (Swiss rounds 2021/22 and Austrian rounds until 2027 live)
FIS Alpine World Ski Championships:
RAI (2023)
Eurosport (2023 and 2025)

Cross-Country Skiing & Nordic Combined
FIS Cross-Country World Cup:
Eurosport (until 2026)
RAI
FIS Nordic Combined World Cup: Eurosport (until 2021)
FIS Nordic World Ski Championships:
Eurosport (2023 and 2025)

Ski Jumping & Ski Flying
FIS Ski Jumping World Cup:
Eurosport (until 2026)
RAI
FIS Ski Flying World Championships: Eurosport and RAI (until 2024)

Biathlon
IBU Biathlon World Cup: Eurosport (until 2026)
IBU World Championships: Eurosport (until 2026)
IBU Cup: Eurosport (until 2026)
Biathlon Junior World Championships: Eurosport (until 2026)
Biathlon European Championships: Eurosport (until 2026)
Summer Biathlon World Championships: Eurosport (until 2026)

Freestyle Skiing
FIS Freestyle Skiing World Cup: Eurosport (until 2026)

Snowboarding
FIS Snowboard World Cup:
Eurosport (until 2026)
RAI
FIS Snowboard World Championships: RAI

Luge
FIL European Luge Championships: RAI
FIL World Luge Championships: RAI

Figure Skating
ISU World Figure Skating Championships (2022 and 2023): RAI, Eurosport
ISU European Figure Skating Championships (2022 and 2023): RAI, Eurosport
ISU Grand Prix of Figure Skating (2022 and 2023): RAI, Eurosport

Tennis
Davis Cup (2023 and 2024):
Sky Sport (all World Group matches live)
SuperTennis
RAI (all Italy matches live)
Bille Jean King Cup: (2023) SuperTennis (all World Group matches live, all Italy matches live)
The Slam:
Australian Open (until 2031): Eurosport
French Open (until 2026): Eurosport
Wimbledon (until 2026): Sky Sport
US Open (from 2023): TBA
ATP World Tour Masters 1000 (until 2028):
Sky Sport (all tournaments live)
SuperTennis (one match a day per tournament FTA delayed) (2023)
ATP Finals (until 2028):
Sky Sport (all matches live) (2028)
RAI (one match per day live) (2023)
ATP World Tour 500 series (2023):
SuperTennis (all tournaments live) (2023)
Sky Sport (5 tournaments live on 2023, all tournaments live from 2024 to 2028)
ATP World Tour 250 series (2023):
SuperTennis (all tournaments live)
Sky Sport (8 tournaments live on 2023, all tournaments live from 2024 to 2028)
NextGen ATP Finals (until 2028):
SuperTennis (all matches live) (2023)
Sky Sport (all matches live)
Laver Cup (until 2030): Eurosport
United Cup: SuperTennis (all matches live)
WTA Tour:
SuperTennis (all WTA1000, WTA500 and WTA250 tournaments live) (2023)
Sky Sport (all WTA1000, WTA500 and WTA250 tournaments live from 2024 to 2028)
WTA Finals:
SuperTennis (all matches live) (2023)
Sky Sport (all matches live from 2024 to 2028)

Volleyball
FIVB Volleyball Men's World Championship: RAI Volleyball World TV (all matches live on a pay-per-view basis)
FIVB Volleyball Women's World Championship: RAI Volleyball World TV (all matches live on a pay-per-view basis)
2023 CEV EuroVolley: CEV EuroVolley TV (all matches live on a pay-per-view basis)
2023 CEV EuroVolley Women: CEV EuroVolley TV (all matches live on a pay-per-view basis)
FIVB Volleyball Men's Nations League: Volleyball World TV (all matches live on a pay-per-view basis)
FIVB Volleyball Women's Nations League: Volleyball World TV (all matches live on a pay-per-view basis)
CEV Champions League:
CEV EuroVolley TV (all matches live on a pay-per-view basis)
Eurosport (all matches live) (2022–23)
CEV Women's Champions League
CEV EuroVolley TV (all matches live on a pay-per-view basis)
Eurosport (all matches live) (2022–23)
CEV Volleyball Cup: CEV EuroVolley TV (all matches live on a pay-per-view basis)
CEV Women's Volleyball Cup: CEV EuroVolley TV (all matches live on a pay-per-view basis)
CEV Volleyball Challenge Cup: CEV EuroVolley TV (all matches live on a pay-per-view basis)
CEV Women's Volleyball Challenge Cup: CEV EuroVolley TV (all matches live on a pay-per-view basis)
SuperLega Credem Banca:
Volleyball World TV (all Regular Season and Play-Off matches live on a pay-per-view basis)
RAI (two matches per Regular Season matchday live, one match of Quarter-Final per game and all Semi-Finals and Finals matches live)
Del Monte Coppa Italia SuperLega:
Volleyball World TV (all matches live on a pay-per-view basis)
RAI (all Final Four matches live)
Del Monte Supercoppa SuperLega:
Volleyball World TV (all matches live on a pay-per-view basis)
RAI (all matches live)
Serie A2 Credem Banca: YouTube (all Regular Season, play-off and play-out matches live)
Del Monte Coppa Italia A2: YouTube (all matches live)
Del Monte Supercoppa A2: YouTube (all matches live)
Serie A3 Credem Banca: Legavolley.tv (all Regular Season, play-off and play-out matches live)
Del Monte Coppa Italia A3: Legavolley.tv (all Regular Season, play-off and play-out matches live)
Del Monte Supercoppa A3: Legavolley.tv (all Regular Season, play-off and play-out matches live)
Serie A1 Femminile:
Volleyball World TV (all Regular Season and Play-off matches live on a pay-per-view basis)
RAI: (one match per Regular Season matchday live, one match of Quarter-Final per game and all Semi-Finals and Finals matches live) (2022/23)
Sky Sport: (one per Regular Season matchday live, selected Quarter-Final and Semi-Finals matches and all Finals matches live) (2022/23)
Coppa Italia A1 Femminile:
Volleyball World TV (all matches live on a pay-per-view basis)
RAI (all Final Four matches live) (2023)
Supercoppa Italiana A1 Femminile (2022): RAI

References

 
Italy